This is a list of people from Mexicali, Baja California.

A

Luis "Abuelo" Álvarez, Mexican archer
Eduardo Auyón, painter

B

Norma Enriqueta Basilio de Sotelo, first female Olympic cauldron lighter

C

Milton Castellanos Everardo, Governor of Baja California, 1971-1977
Dino Cazares, musician, former member of heavy metal bands Fear Factory, Asesino, and Brujería
David Cortés, MLB player for the Colorado Rockies

D

Nadir D'Priest, lead singer of 80s glam metal band London

E

Jorge Enríquez, mexican professional football player

G

Carlos Girón, silver medal winner in diving at the 1980 Olympics

J

Lupita Jones, Miss Mexico 1990, Miss Universe 1991

L

Denisse López, former Olympic gymnast
Luis Alberto Lopez, IBF featherweight boxing champion

M

José Madueña, mexican football player
Alexa Moreno, former Olympic gymnast
Los Muecas, mexican ballad group

N

Nikki Clan, pop-rock band

P
Azriel Páez, professional boxer, son of Jorge, brother of Jorge Jr.
Jorge Páez, former professional boxer, world champion, actor
Jorge Páez, Jr., professional boxer
Tony Perezchica, former infielder for the San Francisco Giants and third base coach for the Arizona Diamondbacks

R

Miguel "Meegs" Rascon, musician, former member of Coal Chamber
Reik, Latin Grammy-nominated pop group
René Jaime Amaya Martínez "Rorrito", television host and entertainer

S

Daniel Sada, poet and writer
Raúl Sandoval, actor and singer

V

Gus Vildósola, off-road racer
Tavo Vildósola, off-road racer
Manuel Vizcarra, Mexican judge, founder of Mexicali
Vazquez Sounds, musical trio formed by the Vazquez siblings

Z
Ysaias Zamudio, former professional boxer

References

Mexicali